An ammonia cookie is a cookie made with baking ammonia as a leavener. In the United States, they are most closely associated with Scandinavian-American cooking.

References

Ammonia
Cookies
American desserts